Sonu Hyang-hui (Korean: 선우향희) is a North Korean violinist. She is best known for her role as leader of the string section of the Moranbong Band.

Early life 
She graduated from Kim Won Gyun University of Music in Pyongyang.

Career 
She performed with the Samjiyon Band (renamed Orchestra in 2018).

In 2012, she became the leader of the string section (and in some concerts concertmaster) of the Moranbong Band. She was missing from the band at times, but re-appeared for some concerts.

Personal life 
In August 2021 she married Kim Yo-Jong.

References

Living people
North Korean violinists
Women violinists
21st-century North Korean women
Year of birth missing (living people)
Place of birth missing (living people)
21st-century violinists